Mamadou Bouba (born 17 February 1988, in N'Djamena, Chad) is a footballer from Chad, who plays as a goalkeeper for Sudanese club Watachim Sinnar.

Career
He started his career with Sahel FC. He moved to Ascot in 2003, where he stayed until 2008, when he moved to Cameroon, where his next club was Panthère du Ndé. Now he plays for Sudanese club Watachim Sinnar.

International career
Bouba debuted for Chad on 27 May 2005 in a friendly match against Sudan (1:1). He also played in the 2008 Africa Cup of Nations qualification matches against South Africa, both home and away. He played on 2006, 2008 and 2009 CEMAC Cup. He was voted the best goalkeeper of the 2008 Cemac Cup in Cameroon. However, most of the CEMAC matches were not counted as FIFA official.

See also
 List of Chad international footballers

References

1988 births
Living people
Chadian footballers
Chadian expatriate footballers
Chad international footballers
Expatriate footballers in Cameroon
People from N'Djamena
Sahel FC players
Chadian expatriate sportspeople in Cameroon
Panthère du Ndé players
Association football goalkeepers